The Yellow Brick House, or Moorfield, is a historic home located at Bivalve, Wicomico County, Maryland, United States. It is a Federal-style two story brick dwelling built about 1810. The house is one of the largest Federal-style dwellings left in Wicomico County.

The Yellow Brick House was listed on the National Register of Historic Places in 1978.

References

External links
, including photo from 1979, at Maryland Historical Trust

Houses in Wicomico County, Maryland
Houses on the National Register of Historic Places in Maryland
Federal architecture in Maryland
Houses completed in 1810
National Register of Historic Places in Wicomico County, Maryland